"Say Yeah" is a song by an American rapper Wiz Khalifa. Released as Khalifa's first single following his signing to Rostrum and Warner Bros. Records but second in overall, following his first single, "Pittsburgh Sound". The song was written by Khalifa, E. Dan, and Johnny Juliano, with production of the song being handled by the latter two. The song heavily samples the 1998 song "Better Off Alone" by Dutch Eurodance group Alice DeeJay.

"Say Yeah" peaked at number 11 on the US Billboard Bubbling Under Hot 100 Singles chart. It also reached the top twenty on the  US Billboard Hot Rap Songs chart. "Say Yeah" was Khalifa's only single to be released on Warner Bros., as he would later leave the label over disputes regarding the release of his major-label debut studio album. The single was also certified gold by the Recording Industry Association of America (RIAA) for sales of 500,000 copies in the United States.

Background
Rostrum Records president Benjy Grinberg first heard about Wiz Khalifa in 2004 when the rapper's contribution to a mixtape of various new Pittsburgh artists attracted his interest. When Grinberg finally met the 16-year-old artist, he immediately decided he wanted to work with him, later telling HitQuarters: "Even though he wasn't all the way developed you could just tell that he was a diamond in the rough, and that with some polishing, guidance and backing he could become something special." Khalifa signed to the label shortly after and began a seven-year period of artist development. Following hype generated by his 2006 album Show and Prove, Khalifa signed to Warner Bros. Records in 2007. "Say Yeah" was released as his first single with the label in January 2008 via digital download. It was later solicited to US rhythmic radio in March.

In July 2009, Khalifa parted ways with Warner Bros. Records after numerous delays in releasing his planned debut album for the label, First Flight. "Say Yeah" remains his only single to be released with the label.

Composition
"Say Yeah" is driven around a club beat built around a sample of "Better Off Alone" by Dutch eurodance group Alice DeeJay. Over the beat, Khalifa "spins smooth party-oriented rhymes".

Music video
The song's music video was directed by Ara Soudjian and premiered in March 2008.

Usage in media
American mashup artist Girl Talk sampled "Say Yeah" on the track "Don't Stop" from his fourth album, Feed the Animals. The song's vocals are mixed together with the songs "Born Slippy .NUXX" by English electronic group Underworld, "Love in This Club" by American R&B singer Usher and "In Between Days" by English rock band The Cure.

Track listing
Digital download
 "Say Yeah" (radio edit) – 3:43
 "Say Yeah" – 4:01

CD single
 "Say Yeah" (album version) – 4:02
 "Say Yeah" (radio edit) – 3:44
 "Say Yeah" (instrumental) – 4:02
 "Say Yeah" (a cappella) – 3:43

Charts

Certifications

Release history

References

2008 singles
Wiz Khalifa songs
2008 songs
Songs written by Wiz Khalifa
Rostrum Records singles
Eurodance songs